Juvenilia are literary, musical or artistic works produced by authors during their youth. Written juvenilia, if published at all, usually appears as a retrospective publication, some time after the author has become well known for later works.

The term was first recorded in 1622 in George Wither's poetry collection Ivvenilia. Later, other notable poets, such as John Dryden and Alfred, Lord Tennyson, came to use the term for collections of their early poetry. The stories and poems which novelist Jane Austen wrote before the age of eighteen are called her Juvenilia.

Exceptions to retrospective publication include Leigh Hunt's collection Juvenilia, first published when he was still in his teens; and Lord Byron's publication of Fugitive Pieces when the author was only 17 years old, and his subsequent publication of Hours of Idleness at the age of 18. In these early pieces, Byron explores many of the themes that would shape his later works.

References

Literary terminology